The following highways are numbered 179:

Canada
Prince Edward Island Route 179

Ireland
  R179 road (Ireland)

Japan
 Japan National Route 179

Malaysia
  Malaysia Federal Route 179

United States
 Interstate 179 (former)
 Alabama State Route 179
 Arizona State Route 179
 Arkansas Highway 179
 California State Route 179
 Connecticut Route 179
 Florida State Road 179 (former)
 Georgia State Route 179 (former)
 Illinois Route 179 (former)
 K-179 (Kansas highway)
 Kentucky Route 179
 Maine State Route 179
 Maryland Route 179
 M-179 (Michigan highway)
 Missouri Route 179
 New Jersey Route 179
 New Mexico State Road 179
 New York State Route 179
 North Carolina Highway 179
 Ohio State Route 179
 Pennsylvania Route 179
 Rhode Island Route 179
 South Carolina Highway 179
 Tennessee State Route 179
 Texas State Highway 179
 Texas State Highway Loop 179
 Farm to Market Road 179 (Texas)
 Utah State Route 179 (former)
 Virginia State Route 179
 Wisconsin Highway 179
Territories
 Puerto Rico Highway 179